Derdang Derdang is the second full-length album by London-based band Archie Bronson Outfit. It was released on 3 April 2006.

Track listing
"Cherry Lips" – 4:17
"Kink" – 2:43
"Dart for My Sweetheart" – 4:30
"Got to Get (Your Eyes)" – 3:14
"Dead Funny" – 4:12
"Modern Lovers" – 3:20
"Cuckoo" – 4:10
"Jab Jab" – 2:53
"How I Sang Dang" – 3:46
"Rituals" – 3:22
"Harp for My Sweetheart" – 2:16

Singles
"Dart for My Sweetheart" (27 February 2006, Domino Records)
"Dead Funny" (3 July 2006, Domino Records, #105 UK)
"Cherry Lips" (9 October 2006, Domino Records, #104 UK)
"Dart for My Sweetheart" (7" vinyl only re-issue, 26 March 2007, Domino Records)

References 

2006 albums
Archie Bronson Outfit albums
Domino Recording Company albums